Universal Cooperatives, based in Eagan, Minnesota, was a cooperative controlled by 17 regional agricultural marketing and agricultural supply cooperatives. The distribution system included 110 regional feed mills, 26 warehouses, and 7 research farms. The company was formed November 1, 1972 by a merger of United Cooperatives, Inc. of Alliance, Ohio and National Cooperatives, Inc. of Albert Lea, Minnesota. The companies had inter-mixed ownership, leading to merger discussion, and eventual merger. On May 11, 2014, Universal Cooperatives, Inc. and its domestic subsidiaries filed for voluntary Chapter 11 bankruptcy.

United Cooperatives, Inc. 

United Cooperatives began in 1930 as Farm Bureau Oil Company, and changed its name in 1936. Founding members include:

 Indiana Farm Bureau Cooperative Association, Indianapolis, Indiana
 Farm Bureau Services, Inc., Lansing, Michigan
 Ohio Farm Bureau Service Company, Columbus, Ohio

National Cooperatives, Inc.

National Cooperatives was founded in 1933 by

 Farm Bureau Oil Company, Indianapolis, Indiana
 Central Cooperative Wholesale, Superior, Wisconsin
 Farmers Union Central Exchange, Saint Paul, Minnesota
 Midland Cooperative Oil Association, Minneapolis, Minnesota
 Union Oil Company (Missouri), in 1935 renamed Consumers Cooperative Association and in 1966 Farmland Industries North Kansas City, Missouri

Brands 

Universal owns the CO-OP brand, which is used on tires, batteries, farm chemicals, animal health products, twine, and lubricants. It distributes tires through the Mr. Tire chain.

External links
 Universal Cooperatives web site

Alliance, Ohio
Economy of the Midwestern United States
Agricultural cooperatives in the United States
Cooperative federations